Ranularia pyrum, common name: the pear triton, is a species of predatory sea snail, a marine gastropod mollusk in the family Cymatiidae.

Description
The shell size varies between 50 mm and 130 mm

Distribution
This species occurs in the Red Sea, in the Indian Ocean off Chagos and the Mascarene Basin and in the Indo-West Pacific.

References

 Orr J. (1985). Hong Kong seashells. The Urban Council, Hong Kong
 Drivas, J. & M. Jay (1988). Coquillages de La Réunion et de l'île Maurice
 Beu A.G. 2010 [August]. Neogene tonnoidean gastropods of tropical and South America: contributions to the Dominican Republic and Panama Paleontology Projects and uplift of the Central American Isthmus. Bulletins of American Paleontology 377-378: 550 pp, 79 pls.

External links
  Linnaeus, C. (1758). Systema Naturae per regna tria naturae, secundum classes, ordines, genera, species, cum characteribus, differentiis, synonymis, locis. Editio decima, reformata [10th revised edition, vol. 1: 824 pp. Laurentius Salvius: Holmiae.]

Cymatiidae
Gastropods described in 1758
Taxa named by Carl Linnaeus